The Avalon explosion, named from the Precambrian fauna of the Avalon Peninsula, is a proposed evolutionary radiation in the history of the Animalia, about 575 million years ago in the Ediacaran Period, with the Avalon explosion being one of three eras grouped in this time. This event is believed to have occurred some 33 million years earlier than the Cambrian explosion. Scientists are still unsure of the full extent behind the development of the Avalon explosion.The Avalon explosion resulted in a rapid increase in organism diversity. Many of the animals and plants from the Avalon are found living in deep marine environments and the Flinders Ranges.The first stages of the Avalon explosion were observed through comparatively minimal species.

History

Charles Darwin predicted a time of ecological growth before the Cambrian Period, but there was no evidence to support it until, the Avalon explosion was proposed in 2008 by Virginia Tech paleontologists after analysis of the morphological space change in several Ediacaran assemblages. The discovery suggests that the early evolution of animals may have involved more than one explosive event. The original analysis has been the subject of dispute in the literature.

Evidence

Trace fossils of these Avalon organisms have been found worldwide, with many found in Newfoundland, in Canada and the Charnwood Forest in England, representing the earliest known complex multicellular organisms. The Avalon explosion theoretically produced the Ediacaran biota. The biota largely disappeared contemporaneously with the rapid increase in biodiversity known as the Cambrian explosion. At this time, all living animal groups were present in the Cambrian oceans.

The Avalon explosion appears similar to the Cambrian explosion in the rapid increase in diversity of morphologies in a relatively small-time frame, followed by diversification within the established body plans, a pattern similar to that observed in other evolutionary events.

Plants and Animals 
The Avalon explosion was a time of early evolution and low diversity in species.  There were over 270 species defined, with 50 different morphological characteristics categories, many of which the anatomical structure had to be inferred with fossils and casts. These species were placed into 20 different genera.  

During this time, animals became bilateral and along with increasing complexity. Many animals during this time fit into the annelid, arthropod, echinoderm, and cnidarian phyla. Animals at this time developed bilateral symmetry with a clear anterior and posterior side, which included species like Spriggina, Charniodiscus and Yorgia.

Along with many of the plants fitting into a now-extinct phylum of Vendobionta. The Vendobionta were radically arranged, with many tubular elements and a central stalk. With frondlets were a prominent aquatic plant during this time, with many different shapes, including fractofusus which is a spindle shape, bradgatia, a lettuce shape; and rangea which was a leaf shape.

See also
 Cambrian Explosion
 Great Ordovician Biodiversification Event
 Carboniferous-Earliest Permian Biodiversification Event

Notes

References 

Evolution of the biosphere
Unsolved problems in biology
Ediacaran life
Biological hypotheses